Porecatu Airport  is the airport serving Porecatu, Brazil.

Airlines and destinations
No scheduled flights operate at this airport.

Accidents and incidents
18 August 2000: a VASP Boeing 737-2A1 registration PP-SMG en route from Foz do Iguaçu to Curitiba was hijacked by 5 persons with the purpose of robbing BRL 5 million (approximately US$2.75 million at that time) that the aircraft was transporting. The pilot was forced to land at Porecatu, where the hijackers fled with the money. There were no victims.

Access

See also

List of airports in Brazil

References

External links

Airports in Paraná (state)